Since 2011, the European Commission assesses a 3-year list of Critical Raw Materials (CRMs) for the EU economy within its Raw Materials Initiative. To date, 14 CRMs were identified in 2011, 20 in 2014, 27 in 2017 and 30 in 2020. These materials are mainly used in energy transition and digital technologies.

In the U.S., critical minerals that are at risk of shortage or supply chain disruption are assessed by the United States Geological Survey and by the National Science and Technology Council.

European lists of critical raw materials
All critical raw materials are graphically summarised on the periodic table of elements published in review paper "The Critical Raw Materials in Cutting Tools for Machining Applications: A Review".

 

They are also shown in the table below.

Definition
Critical materials have been defined as "raw materials for which there are no viable substitutes with current technologies, which most consumer countries are dependent on importing, and whose supply is dominated by one or a few producers".

Several factors may combine to make a raw material (mineral or not) a critical resource.  These may include the following:

A ceiling on production: when the raw material reaches its Hubbert peak

A drop in proven reserves
A decline in the ratio of production from the biggest deposits to production from smaller deposits, since the largest deposits supply most of a raw material's production
Inefficient price system: when the increase in the price of a raw material does not result in a proportional increase in its production

Costs of extraction (money or effort) increase over time, as extraction becomes more difficult.

Issues
There are many issues about these resources and they concern a large number of people and human activities. It is possible to distinguish:

Economic: the price of metals increases when their scarcity or inaccessibility increases, and not only according to demand for them. As part of transition management, the circular economy invites citizens to recycle these resources as well as to save them and/or to replace them with alternatives when it is possible; that could be greatly facilitated with the generalization of ecotax and eco-design.
Geostrategic: These rare products are necessary for computer and other communications equipment and can themselves be the subject of armed conflict or simply provide armed conflict with a source of funding. Both coltan and blood diamonds have been examples of the resource curse that plagues some parts of Africa.
Social: Increasing globalization and mobility of people, means that telecoms and social networks depend more and more on the availability of these resources.
Health: Several critical metals or minerals are toxic or reprotoxic. Paradoxically, some cytotoxins are used in cancer therapy (and then also improperly discarded although really dangerous for the environment; the average cost of the treatment of a lung cancer varies between 20,000 and 27,000 euros). Thus, toxic and cancer-causing platinum is also widely used in cancer chemotherapy in the form of carboplatin and cisplatin, both cytotoxins combined with other molecules, including for example gemcitabine (GEM), vinorelbine (VIN), docetaxel (DOC), and paclitaxel (PAC).

Energy: Production of these metals and their compounds requires a significant and increasing amount of energy, and when they become rarer, it is necessary to search deeper for them, and the further mineral recovered is sometimes less condensed than previous production had been. In 2012, from 7 to 8% of all the energy used in the world was used to extract these minerals.
Environmental: The mines degrade the environment. The dispersion of minerals and toxic non-recycled metals degrades it too. Furthermore, the magnets in electrical motors, or wind and water turbines, as well as some components of solar panels also need many of these same minerals or rare metals.

Urgency 

According to the United Nations in 2011, as the demand for rare metals will quickly exceed the consumed tonnage in 2013, it is urgent and priority should be placed on recycling rare metals with a worldwide production lower than 100 000 t/year, in order to conserve natural resources and energy. However, this measure will not be enough.  Planned obsolescence of products which contain these metals should be limited, and all elements inside computers, mobile phones or other electronic objects found in electronic waste should be recycled.  This involves looking for eco-designed alternatives, and changes in consumer behavior in favor of selective sorting aimed at an almost total recycling of these metals.

In the same time, the demand for these materials "has to be optimized or reduced", insist Ernst Ulrich von Weizsäcker and Ashok Khosla, co-presidents of the International Resource Panel created in 2007 by the United States, and hosted by the UNEP to analyse the impact of resource use on the environment in 2013.

Europe alone produced about 12 million tons of metallic wastes in 2012, and this amount tended to grow more than 4% a year (faster than municipal waste).  However, fewer than 20 metals, of the 60 studied by experts of the UNEP, were recycled to more than 50% in the world.  34 compounds were recycled at lower than 1% of the total discarded as trash.

According to the UNEP, even without new technologies, that rate could be greatly increased.  The energy efficiency of the production and recycling methods has also to be developed.

Information about the location of deposits of rare metals is scarce. In 2013, the US DOE created the Critical Materials Institute, whose intended role is to focus on finding and commercializing ways to reduce reliance on the critical materials essential for American competitiveness in the clean energy technologies.

A counter-perspective is represented by Indra Overland, who has heavily criticised analyses that posit critical materials for renewable energy as a bottleneck for transition to renewable energy and/or as a source of geopolitical tension. Such analyses ignore the fact that unlike fossil fuels, most critical minerals can be recycled and technological innovation will enable better exploration, extraction, and processing. Especially the importance of rare earth elements for renewable energy applications has been exaggerated, according to Overland.  Neodymium magnets are only needed for a rare type of wind turbine that uses permanent magnets. Even for offshore wind developments it is not clear whether permanent magnets will be much needed.

European strategy
On 3 September 2020, the European Commission presented its strategy to both strengthen and better control its supply of some thirty materials deemed critical, in particular rare earths, in order to lead the green and digital revolution. The list includes, for example:
 graphite, lithium and cobalt, used in the manufacture of electric batteries;
 silicon, an essential component of solar panels;
 rare earths used for magnets, 
 conductive seeds and electronic components. 
The Commission estimates that the EU will need 18 times more lithium and five times more cobalt by 2030 to meet its climate targets. Many of these materials exist in Europe; the Commission estimates that by 2025 Europe could supply 80% of its automotive industry's needs. Recycling will be developed.

Where European resources are insufficient, the Commission promises to strengthen long-term partnerships, notably with Canada, Africa and Australia.

See also

Colonization
Conflict resource
Françafrique
Kimberly process
Moon mining
Petroleum politics
Strategic material

References

Natural resources
Minerals
Environmental impact of mining